The Sun Shines Brighter is the second studio album from English band Ultra, released on 24 October 2006, seven years after their debut album Ultra. The lineup consists of James Hearn, vocals and piano; Michael Harwood, vocals and guitar; Nick Keynes, bass; and Jon O'Mahony, drums and percussion.

The majority of the songs were written by the four original members of the band who reunited in 2005 to write and record it. James Hearn wrote "Happiness". Former member Alistair Griffin wrote "Don't Let Go" and  "In Your Smile", and also co-wrote "Feeling Alive". Griffin's vocals have been used on "In Your Smile" and "Feeling Alive", although these appear to have been recorded some time previously, before he re-recorded the versions which are included on his own 2004 solo album Bring It On.

The album was recorded in London and Italy, on the band's own Goldust label. Producer credits include Ian Stanley (who produced their first album), Claudio Guidetti  and Ash Howes.

Track listing

References

External links
 The Sun Shines Brighter on Discogs

2006 albums
Albums produced by Ian Stanley
Ultra (British band) albums